In the 1999–2000 Heineken Cup pool stage matches, teams received 
2 points for a win 
1 point for a draw

Pool 1

Pool 2

Pool 3

Pool 4

Pool 5

Pool 6

Results

Seeding

See also
1999-2000 Heineken Cup

References

Heineken Cup pool stages
Pool Stage